Arto Matti Vihtori Melleri (7 September 1956 in Lappajärvi – 13 May 2005 in Helsinki) was a Finnish poet and writer. Melleri gained fame with the play, Pete Q, in the 1970s. He studied at the Theatre Academy of Helsinki between 1976 - 1980. He was granted an artist's Finnish state pension in 2003.

Melleri was a diverse writer; his output consisted of poetry, collections of short stories, plays, a film script and an opera libretto.

Melleri was an archetype of a Finnish bohemian poet. He was hit by a car in 1998, causing him brain damage which eventually led to his death. Melleri was married to Nadja Pyykkö.

Tahvo Hirvonen made a 2003 documentary film about Arto Melleri, called Wanderer of a Lonely Star.

References

1956 births
2005 deaths
People from Lappajärvi
Finnish male poets
Writers from South Ostrobothnia
Finlandia Prize winners
Pedestrian road incident deaths
20th-century Finnish poets
20th-century male writers
Road incident deaths in Finland
Neurological disease deaths in Finland
People with traumatic brain injuries